The 2018–19 Combined Counties Football League season (known as the 2018–19 Cherry Red Records Combined Counties Football League for sponsorship reasons) was the 41st in the history of the Combined Counties Football League, a football competition in England.

The constitution was announced on 25 May 2018.

Premier Division

The Premier Division was reduced from 22 to 20 clubs, and featured four new teams after the promotion of Westfield and Bedfont Sports to the Southern League, the transfer of North Greenford United to Spartan South Midlands League Division One, and the relegation of Godalming Town, Epsom & Ewell and Farnham Town to Division One:

Badshot Lea, promoted as third-placed club in Division One.
Cobham, promoted as runners-up in Division One.
Raynes Park Vale, promoted as fifth-placed club in Division One.
Southall, promoted and transferred from the Spartan South Midlands League.

League table

Division One

Division One featured seven new teams after Worcester Park, Staines Lammas and Farleigh Rovers were demoted for ground grading reasons, South Park Reserves left the league, and Badshot Lea, Cobham and Raynes Park Vale were promoted to the Premier Division:

British Airways, promoted from the Middlesex County League.
Dorking Wanderers Reserves, joining from outside the pyramid structure (Suburban League).
Epsom & Ewell, relegated from the Premier Division.
Farnham Town, relegated from the Premier Division.
Godalming Town, relegated from the Premier Division.
Sandhurst Town, transferred from the Hellenic League.
Tooting Bec, promoted from the Surrey Elite Intermediate League.

Reserve sides were not eligible for promotion to Step 5.

League table

References

External links
 Combined Counties League Official Site

2018-19
9